In mathematics Lévy's constant (sometimes known as the Khinchin–Lévy constant) occurs in an expression for the asymptotic behaviour of the denominators of the convergents of continued fractions.
In 1935, the Soviet mathematician Aleksandr Khinchin showed that the denominators qn of the convergents of the continued fraction expansions of almost all real numbers satisfy 

Soon afterward, in 1936, the French mathematician Paul Lévy found the explicit expression for the constant, namely
 

In particular, the ratio has the asymptotic density function

This gives Lévy's constant as

.

The base-10 logarithm of Lévy's constant, which is approximately 0.51532041…, is half of the reciprocal of the limit in Lochs' theorem.

See also
Khinchin's constant

References

Further reading

External links
 
 

Continued fractions
Mathematical constants
Paul Lévy (mathematician)